The Singaporean government has established four nature reserves in Singapore. There are Bukit Timah Nature Reserve, Central Catchment Nature Reserve, Labrador Nature Reserve, and Sungei Buloh Wetland Reserve.

History
One of the first notions of nature reserves in Singapore was thought up by the then-Singapore Botanical Gardens Supritendent N. C. Cantley who, in 1882, proposed that select areas of land be preserved. In as early as 1883, the Bukit Timah Nature Reserve (as it is now known) was established, making it the inaugural nature reserve in Singapore. The Singapore Nature Reserves Act officially came into action in 1971.

Biosphere reserves
The Public Utilities Board-maintained Central Catchment Nature Reserve is Singapore's largest nature reserve. The Sungei Buloh Wetland Reserve aids in the conservation of both bird species and mangrove plants. Chek Jawa is situated in eastern Pulau Ubin.The Labrador Nature Reserve is located by the sea. Described as "an oasis of tranquility and natural wonders", it teems with vast animal life, as well as plant life by the cliff. The  large Sungei Buloh Wetland Reserve comprises mostly wetland and a few bird species, most notably the shorebird, can be spotted there. It is cited as the "first wetlands reserve to be gazetted in Singapore".

Issues
Owing to rapid urban development, the country is in need of more land for things such as housing, which is deemed more important than nature reservation. One possible issue faced by the biosphere reserves in Singapore is that they will be turned into nothingness by the government when the need arises. There was an instance when the government had wanted to reclaim part of Chek Jawa, but this was opposed by conservationists and it was ultimately not reclaimed.

Gallery

See also 
 Protected areas of Singapore

References

 
Protected areas of Singapore